The Roland M. Filhiol House, at 111 Stone Ave. in Monroe, Louisiana, was built in 1895.  It was listed on the National Register of Historic Places in 1995.

It is a one-and-a-half-story Queen Anne frame cottage with decorative Eastlake details inside and out.

References

National Register of Historic Places in Ouachita Parish, Louisiana
Queen Anne architecture in Louisiana
Houses completed in 1895